The Reluctant Magician (Italian: Il Mago per forza) is a 1951 Italian comedy film directed by Marino Girolami and starring Tino Scotti, Isa Barzizza and Aroldo Tieri.

It was shot at the Farnesina Studios of Titanus in Rome. The film's sets were designed by the art director Flavio Mogherini. It earned 136 million Lira at the domestic box office.

Synopsis
To avoid capture, a criminal on the run passes himself off as a magician. However, he comes to be an enormous hit and begins to strongly identify with the role.

Cast
 Tino Scotti as Cavaliere 
 Isa Barzizza as Perla 
 Aroldo Tieri as Mago Trapani 
 Adriano Rimoldi as Industriale 
 Sophia Loren as La Sposa
 Carlo Mazzoni as Lo Sposo
 Mirella Uberti
 Dorian Gray 
 Franco Volpi 
 Mario Pisu 
 Mario Siletti 
 Vittorio Sanipoli 
 Arturo Bragaglia

References

Bibliography
 Chiti, Roberto & Poppi, Roberto. Dizionario del cinema italiano: Dal 1945 al 1959. Gremese Editore, 1991.

External links
 

1951 films
Italian comedy films
1950s Italian-language films
Films directed by Marino Girolami
1951 comedy films
Italian black-and-white films
Titanus films
1950s Italian films